Vespa analis, the yellow-vented hornet, is a species of common hornet found in Southeast Asia.

Description 
This species varies in colours and patterns, in Southeast Asia, they are usually black with a yellow marking on the tip of the abdomen (the sixth segment) In Singapore, they are coloured slightly lighter, with red or brown heads and pronotums. Specimens from sub-tropical, mountainous or temperate areas have yellow heads. In areas where they occur with the Asian giant hornet, they tend to resemble a similar colour and pattern to the Asian Giant Hornet.

Distribution 
This species is one of the most widely distributed hornets. It can be found in temperate areas such as Japan, Russia and Korea, and is also found over much of China and Taiwan, down to tropical regions like Singapore and Indonesia.

Behaviours 
Vespa analis is a typical tree-dwelling hornet. Its nests are generally built from six to ten feet above ground, lower than those of Vespa affinis and Vespa velutina. The nest envelope is usually quite dark and sturdy, and has a coarsely imbricate pattern, with large, obvious overlapping circular sections. In temperate areas, the nest gets only very slightly oval, and the colony size is generally not very large. However, nests in the tropics reach substantial sizes. There is also the same variation seen in nests of Vespa affinis; nests in tropical regions are tapered from the top and get wider further down. 
Their diet is relatively similar to other hornet species of Southeast Asia, catching butterflies, honeybees and dragonflies. However, unlike some hornet species in Southeast Asia, they do not scavenge on dead animals or food left behind by people. 

This species is generally considered to be one of the least defensive species. However, in Japan, it is responsible for quite a number of attacks, due to its abundance and its fondness for building near human habitation.

Life cycle 
This species appears to have a fairly long colony cycle, as workers have been spotted trying to hunt in early January, indicating that some nests still have brood or new queens then.

References

Sources 
"Vespa analis" at http://www.vespa-bicolor.net/main/vespid/vespa-analis.htm accessed on the 11th October 2020

Insects described in 1798
Vespidae
Hymenoptera of Asia
Taxa named by Johan Christian Fabricius